Harry Alonzo Longabaugh (1867 – November 7, 1908), better known as the Sundance Kid, was an outlaw and member of Butch Cassidy's Wild Bunch in the American Old West. He likely met Butch Cassidy (real name Robert Leroy Parker) during a hunting trip in 1883 or earlier. The "Wild Bunch" gang performed the longest string of successful train and bank robberies in American history. Longabaugh fled the United States along with his consort Etta Place and Butch Cassidy to escape the dogged pursuit of the Pinkerton Detective Agency. The trio fled first to Argentina and then to Bolivia, where most historians believe Parker (Cassidy) and Longabaugh were killed in a shootout in November 1908.

Early life 
Longabaugh was born in Mont Clare, Pennsylvania, in 1867 to Pennsylvania natives Josiah and Annie G. Longabaugh, the youngest of five children. At age 15, he traveled west in a covered wagon with his cousin George to help settle George's homestead near Cortez, Colorado. While there, he found work as a wrangler at a neighboring ranch, and he learned to buy and breed horses. He left Cortez in 1886 and struck out on his own, drifting north and working on ranches. He found work on the N Bar N Ranch in Montana Territory, but the hard winter of 1886–1887 forced the ranch to lay off wranglers, including Longabaugh. Longabaugh drifted to the Black Hills before turning back to try to find work again at the N Bar N.

Career 
In 1887, while traveling across the Three V Ranch near Sundance, Wyoming, he stole a gun, horse, and saddle from a cowboy. He was captured by authorities in Miles City, Montana, and sentenced to 18 months in jail by Judge William L. Maginnis. He adopted the nickname Sundance Kid during this time in jail. After his release, he went back to working as a ranch hand, and he worked at the Bar U Ranch in the North-West Territories of Canada in 1891, which was one of the largest commercial ranches of the time. He became joint owner of a saloon in the Grand Central Hotel in Calgary, but after quarreling with his partner, he headed south to Montana again. There, he took another job with the N Bar N and began rustling cattle and horses in Montana and Canada.

Longabaugh was suspected of taking part in a train robbery in 1892 and a bank robbery in 1897 with five other men. He became associated with a group known as the Wild Bunch, which included Robert Leroy Parker, better known as Butch Cassidy. Longabaugh was reportedly fast with a gun and was often referred to as a gunfighter, but he is not known to have killed anyone prior to a shootout in Bolivia in which Parker and he allegedly were killed. He became better known than Kid Curry, a member of his gang whose real name was Harvey Logan; Curry killed numerous men while with the gang. Longabaugh did participate in a shootout with lawmen who trailed a gang led by George Curry to the Hole-in-the-Wall hideout in Wyoming, and he was thought to have wounded two men in that shootout. Several people were killed by members of the gang, including five law enforcement officers killed by Logan. "Wanted dead or alive" posters were posted throughout the country, with rewards of as much as a $30,000 for information leading to their capture or deaths.

Longabaugh and Logan used a log cabin at Old Trail Town in Cody, Wyoming, as a hide-out, as they planned to rob a bank in Red Lodge, Montana. They then began hiding out at Hole-in-the-Wall, located near Kaycee, Wyoming. From there, they could strike and retreat with little fear of capture, since it was situated on high ground with a view of the surrounding territory in all directions. Pinkerton detectives led by Charlie Siringo, however, hounded the gang for a few years. Parker, Longabaugh, and his consort Etta Place left the United States on February 20, 1901, aboard the British ship Herminius for Buenos Aires, Argentina.

A man going under the name Frank Boyd, who was in reality Sundance/Longabaugh, killed a police officer on August 21, 1905 in a shootout at the port town of Antofagasta, Chile. He was released on a bond (equivalent to US$50,000 in 2022) and then, assisted by the US vice-consul in Antofagasta, fled to Argentina and finally Bolivia. This was not known until 2022, when the old Antofagasta El Industrial newspaper was digitized.

Death 
A courier was conveying the payroll for the Aramayo Franke y Cia silver mine on November 3, 1908, near San Vicente Canton, Bolivia, when he was attacked and robbed by two masked American bandits. The bandits then proceeded to the mining town of San Vicente, where they lodged in a small boarding house owned by Bonifacio Casasola, a miner. Casasola became suspicious of them because they had a mule with the Aramayo Mine's brand; he informed a nearby telegraph officer, who notified the Abaroa cavalry unit stationed nearby. The unit dispatched three soldiers under the command of Captain Justo Concha, and they notified the local authorities. The mayor, a number of his officials, and the three soldiers from the Abaroa regiment surrounded the house on the evening of 6 November. The bandits then opened fire, killing one of the soldiers and wounding another, which started a gunfight. The police and soldiers heard a man screaming from inside the house around 2 am, during a lull in the firing. They subsequently heard a single shot from inside the house, after which the screaming stopped, then heard another shot minutes later.

The soldiers entered the house the next morning and found two dead bodies, both with numerous bullet wounds to the arms and legs. One of the men had a bullet wound in the forehead and the other had a bullet wound in the temple. The police report surmised from the positions of the bodies that one bandit had shot his mortally wounded partner to put him out of his misery, before killing himself with his final bullet soon after. The Tupiza police investigation concluded that the dead men were the bandits who had robbed the Aramayo payroll transport, but the Bolivian authorities could not positively identify them. The bodies were buried at the San Vicente cemetery, where they were interred close to the grave of Gustav Zimmer, a German miner. American forensic anthropologist Clyde Snow and his researchers attempted to find the graves in 1991, but they did not find any remains with DNA matching the living relatives of Parker or Longabaugh.

Some have claimed that one or both men survived and returned to the United States. One of these claims was that Longabaugh lived under the name of William Henry Long in the small town of Duchesne, Utah. Long died in 1936, and his remains were exhumed in December 2008 and subjected to DNA testing. Anthropologist John McCullough stated Long's remains did not match the DNA which they had obtained "from a distant relative of the Sundance Kid."

In popular culture 
 Arthur Kennedy portrayed the Sundance Kid in the 1947 film Cheyenne (later retitled The Wyoming Kid).
 Longabaugh was portrayed by Robert Ryan in the 1948 film Return of the Bad Men, although the film is inaccurate in a number of points, not least of which are the cold-blooded killings by the character and his death at the end of the movie.
 He was depicted as a character in the 1951 film The Texas Rangers played by Ian MacDonald. The fictional tale has real-life outlaws Sam Bass, John Wesley Hardin, Butch Cassidy and Dave Rudabaugh and him forming a gang, then squaring off against two convicts recruited by John B. Jones to bring them to justice.
 He was portrayed by Alan Hale, Jr. in the 1956 film The Three Outlaws, with Neville Brand as Butch Cassidy.
 Scott Brady played him in the 1956 film The Maverick Queen.
 Robert Redford played him in the 1969 film Butch Cassidy and the Sundance Kid. Redford named the Sundance Film Festival after the Sundance Kid.
 Elizabeth Montgomery played his fugitive girlfriend in the 1974 film Mrs. Sundance.
 William Katt portrayed the Sundance Kid and Tom Berenger played Butch in Butch and Sundance: The Early Days (1979).
 Padraic Delaney portrayed him in the 2011 film Blackthorn.
 He is an antagonist in the video game Call of Juarez: Gunslinger (2013).
 Butch Cassidy and Sundance Kid are supporting characters in the Drifters manga series by Kouta Hirano.

See also 
 List of fugitives from justice who disappeared

References

Bibliography 

 Pages 42–47 tell the story of Kid Curry and the failed attempt at a bank robbery in Red Lodge.

External links 
 

1867 births
1908 deaths
19th-century American criminals
American bank robbers
American emigrants to Argentina
American escapees
American expatriates in Argentina
American people of English descent
American people of German descent
American people of Welsh descent
Butch Cassidy's Wild Bunch
Cowboys
Deaths by firearm in Bolivia
Outlaws of the American Old West
People from Upper Providence Township, Montgomery County, Pennsylvania
Train robbers